Pouerua is a 270 m high basaltic scoria cone, in the Kaikohe-Bay of Islands volcanic field in New Zealand. It is in the locality of Pakaraka and was the site of a pā that was studied during a major archeological project in the 1980s. Pouerua is registered with the Historic Places Trust as a traditional site (Registration Number 6711).

The last Māori who occupied Pouerua were the Ngāti Rāhiri subtribe of Ngāpuhi. They left in about 1860.

According to the Historic Places Trust, Pouerua is considered the origin and the watershed or pou of the two tribal areas of Ngapuhi, at the Hokianga in the west and Taumarere in the east.

References

The Archaeology of Pouerua (Auckland University Press)
Geological Society of New Zealand

External links
 Aerial view of Pouerua volcano and pā.

Volcanoes of the Northland Region
Far North District